Stephen John Tkowski (born October 3, 1989),  better known by his ring name T. K. O'Ryan, is an American professional wrestler known for his time in Ring of Honor (ROH), where he is a three-time ROH World Six-Man Tag Team Champion as part of The Kingdom.

Professional wrestling career

Training
O'Ryan began his training with "H2O" Ryan Waters and Nick Steel at The Lock-Up Wrestling School of Professional Wrestling in Fall River, MA in June 2014.  Other early matches were wrestled for Northeast Wrestling in CT (his home promotion in which he debuted April 18, 2015 in a match against Frankie Arion), Xtreme Wrestling Alliance in West Warwick, RI and Pioneer Valley Pro Wrestling in Hadley, MA.

Ring of Honor (2016–2020)

T. K. made his Ring of Honor debut on October 1, 2016, in Lowell, MA as a part of The Kingdom (with Matt Taven and Vinny Marseglia). They defeated The Bullet Club (Adam Cole and The Young Bucks).

On December 2, 2016, The Kingdom became the first-ever ROH World Six-Man Tag Team Champions by defeating Kushida, Lio Rush & Jay White.

O'Ryan was injured on March 10, 2017, during the ROH 15th Anniversary Show when he jumped too far on an Asai Moonsault and broke his leg on a guard rail. The following day, Silas Young replaced O'Ryan in a match, where The Kingdom lost the ROH World Six-Man Tag Team Championship to Bully Ray and The Briscoes.

On May 9, 2018, at ROH/NJPW War of the Worlds Tour, The Kingdom would regain the ROH World Six-Man Tag Team Championship by defeating SoCal Uncensored. On September 27, 2019, on Death Before Dishonor XVII, O'Ryan and Marseglia was attacked backstage. On ROH Television, O'Ryan announced The Kingdom was now disbanded after Marseglia's attack towards Taven. He would then announce he would be stepping away from the ring for time to take care of a leg injury and several concussions suffered throughout the year. In October 2020, his profile was removed from ROH website.

Championships and accomplishments
	Canadian Wrestling's Elite
Elite 8 Tournament (2019)
Northeast Wrestling
NEW Heavyweight Championship (1 time)
NEW Tag Team Championship (1 time) - with Vinny Marseglia
Pioneer Valley Pro Wrestling
Pioneer Valley Pro Tag Team Championship (1 time) – with Hammer Tunis
Pro Wrestling Illustrated
 Ranked No. 148 of the top 500 singles wrestlers in the PWI 500 in 2019
Ring of Honor
ROH World Six-Man Tag Team Championship (3 times) – with Matt Taven and Vinny Marseglia
ROH World Six-Man Tag Team Championship Tournament (2016) – with Matt Taven and Vinny Marseglia
Top Rope Promotions
TRP Tag Team Championship (1 time) – with Brad Hollister
Xtreme Wrestling Alliance
XWA Heavyweight Championship (1 time)

References

External links 
 

Living people
1989 births
American male professional wrestlers
People from Bourne, Massachusetts
Sportspeople from Barnstable County, Massachusetts
Professional wrestlers from Massachusetts
ROH World Six-Man Tag Team Champions